Erica Louise Stanford (née Poppelbaum; born 1978) is a New Zealand politician and Member of Parliament in the House of Representatives for the National Party.

Personal life
Stanford lives in Okura in the Auckland region and is the daughter of a Dutch immigrant. She holds a Bachelor of Arts in politics from the University of Auckland, and cites a lecturer, Dr Raymond Miller, as the reason for her passion for politics. She is married, meeting her husband Kane while at Rangitoto College, and has two children.

Stanford has worked in export sales as well as producing local television shows. This included being the producer of a reality TV show called Noise Control, in which she and a camera operator followed a noise control team around Auckland. In filming one episode, a person pointed a gun at her and her cameraman; the episode was one of the most-watched in the series. She also produced the show Last Chance Dog, and wrote scripts and did other work on Piha Rescue for more than six years.

Political career

She took the place of her sister who previously worked for McCully. She joined the National Party at the same time. When she started in the office, she worked there two days a week as one of three jobs while also having two children. She later worked there full time, and prior to running for parliament, she held the role of Senior MP Support. Stanford describes McCully as her mentor, calling him "a political master."

Stanford had not previously stood for parliament or other office. In the 2017 general election, Stanford won the electorate easily, with 66% of the vote.

In the 2020 election, Stanford stood again for East Coast Bays. During the campaign she also attended a debate of Auckland Central candidates, as National had not selected a new candidate for the electorate by the debate. Stanford retained East Coast Bays by a margin of 8,764 votes.

Political views 
In her maiden speech Stanford spoke on matters of conservation, sustainability, marriage based on love rather than gender, and a desire to see political parties work with one another to seek enduring, practical solutions. In a 2018 interview, she said her priorities in her first term included resourcing police stations in her electorate, improving local roading projects, and supporting local schools.

Stanford's political views sit on the progressive side of the National Party. She supported decriminalising abortion and allowing euthanasia in conscience votes in 2019. She has sat on the environmental select committee and has been involved in developing National's environmental policies. In 2019 she supported students who were striking for climate action, despite her party leader and many other National MPs initially opposing them. She believes that the Green Party could work with National, saying that if the Greens "could just relax a little bit... they could do so much good." Stanford says that her blood "runs blue and it always will", but acknowledges a touch of green, saying "maybe it's a tealy blue".

Stanford was promoted as the spokesperson for education and associate spokesperson for Ethnic Communities while retaining her portfolio for immigration on 6 December 2021, in the Shadow Cabinet of Christopher Luxon. This led to her ranking being promoted from 25 under the Shadow Cabinet of Judith Collins to 7 under the Shadow Cabinet of Christopher Luxon.

References

Living people
New Zealand National Party MPs
Members of the New Zealand House of Representatives
New Zealand MPs for Auckland electorates
Women members of the New Zealand House of Representatives
Candidates in the 2017 New Zealand general election
1978 births
New Zealand people of Dutch descent
21st-century New Zealand women politicians